Thony Andenas (born 12 December 1974, in Villeneuve-Saint-Georges, France) is a French former professional footballer who played as a forward. He made 19 appearances and scored six goals in Ligue 2 for US Créteil-Lusitanos and Nîmes Olympique between 1992 and 2002.

References

1974 births
Living people
French footballers
Association football forwards
Ligue 2 players
Championnat National players
Championnat National 2 players
US Créteil-Lusitanos players
Tours FC players
Nîmes Olympique players